In Shifting Sands: The Truth About Unscom and the Disarming of Iraq is a 2001 documentary by Scott Ritter that discusses the UNSCOM inspections in Iraq.  Ritter was a chief United Nations weapons inspector in Iraq from 1991 to 1998.  These inspections were in search of "weapons of mass destruction" during the later years of the regime of Saddam Hussein.

The film was completed and distributed for theatrical release prior to the 2003 invasion of Iraq.

The film argued that Iraq did not possess weapons of mass destruction because of the UN weapons inspection programme. Ritter's documentary was partially financed by Iraqi American businessman Shakir al Khafaji. Ritter denied any quid pro quo with Al-Khafaji, according to Laurie Mylroie, writing for the Financial Times. When Ritter was asked "how he would characterize anyone suggesting that Mr. Khafaji was offering allocations in [his] name", Mr. Ritter replied: "I'd say that person's a fucking liar ... and tell him to come over here so I can kick his ass." Al-Khafaji pled guilty to multiple felony charges in 2004 for his involvement with the U.N. Oil-for-Food scandal.

See also
Iraq and weapons of mass destruction
United Nations Special Commission

References

External links

Monarch Films description of film
New York Times review

2001 films
Documentary films about Iraq
Iraq and weapons of mass destruction
American documentary films
2001 documentary films
2000s English-language films
2000s American films
English-language documentary films